No Good to Anyone is the eleventh studio album by American band Today Is the Day, released on February 28, 2020 through BMG and The End Records, the first recording by the group to be issued through a major label. The album went through a lengthy production process as a result of health complications frontman Steve Austin faced, and was released five years after the band's 2014 album Animal Mother, marking the longest gap between albums for the band. Jef Whitehead of black metal band Leviathan painted the cover artwork for the album.

The album was promoted with three digital-only singles: "No Good to Anyone", "You're All Gonna Die", and "Burn in Hell", the third of which had a music video produced for it.

Background
Production for the album begun in 2016, and shortly thereafter the band signed to The End Records for its release as well as the reissue of the band's back catalogue. Many of the album's lyrics were inspired by health problems Austin faced before and during production of the album: both he and his pet dog Callie contracted Lyme disease, and as a result Callie had to be euthanized. The track "Callie" was written to commemorate her. Before that, Austin had been involved in an accident in late 2014 during the band's tour in promotion of Animal Mother, in which the band's van collided with another vehicle, resulting in Austin breaking his ribs.

The track "Orland" was performed by Austin's son, Will Austin, who also played piano on "Rockets and Dreams".

Reception

Writing for Kerrang!, Angela Davey wrote positively about the album stating that it's "a disconcerting listening experience" and "one hell of a trip", ultimately awarding the album four out of five stars. Similarly, writing for Blabbermouth.net, Jay H. Goraina praised the variety of styles used on the songs, stating that "there is no weak link in No Good to Anyone".

Track listing

Personnel
Adapted from the No Good to Anyone liner notes.

Today Is the Day
Steve Austin – vocals, guitar, production, engineering, mastering
Tom Bennett – drums, percussion
DJ Cox – bass guitar, Moog

Additional musicians
Will Austin – piano on "Orland" and "Rockets and Dreams"
Mark Ablasou – "Agate" and introduction to "Mexico"
Jon Morse – "The Last Call"

Artwork
Jef Whitehead – Cover artwork
Gianni Tbay – Graphic layout

Release history

References

External links
 

2020 albums
Today Is the Day albums
The End Records albums